"Emma-Lee" is the first single taken from Swedish singer Johan Palm's debut studio album My Antidote, which was released after his participation in Idol 2008. The song reached number one on the Swedish Singles Chart and was composed by British Singer-Songwriter Ashley Hicklin, Swedish writer-producer Mårten Eriksson and his partner Lina Eriksson.

Charts

References

2009 songs
Songs written by Ashley Hicklin
Songs written by Lina Eriksson
Songs written by Mårten Eriksson